Sahaspur Lohara  is a village in Kawardha tehsil, Kawardha district, Chhattisgarh, India.

Demographics
In the 2001 India census, the village of Lohara in Kawardha district had a population of 5,332, with 2,715 males (50.9%) and 2,617 females (49.1%), for a gender ratio of 964 females per thousand males.

References

Villages in Kabirdham district